Bulgarians are a recognized national minority in Serbia. According to the 2011 census, there are 18,543 ethnic Bulgarians composing 0.3% of the population of Serbia. The vast majority of them live in the southeastern part of the country, bordering Bulgaria and North Macedonia.

History

The regional names once used by many people in the Torlakian-speaking region was Torlaci and Šopi speaking a transitional speech between Bulgarian and Serbian. Before the Ottoman conquest, the borders of the region frequently shifted between Byzantine, Bulgarian  and Serbian rulers. According to some authors during the Ottoman rule, the majority of native Torlakian Slavic population did not have a distinct national consciousness in the ethnic sense. The first known literary monument, influenced by Torlakian dialects is the Manuscript from Temska Monastery from 1762, in which its author, the Monk Kiril Zhivkovich from Pirot, considered his language as: "simple Bulgarian".

A Silesian traveler stated in 1596 that the road of his trip from Sofia to Niš was filled with corpses and described the gates of Niš as standing in front of freshly beheaded heads of poor Bulgarian peasants by the Ottoman army. The Pirot Rebellion broke out in 1836, followed by the Niš rebellion in 1836, which also included Pirot. According to Ottoman statistics during the Tanzimat the greater part of the population up to the Sanjak of Niš was treated as Bulgarian. According to all authors between 1840-72 the delineation between Bulgarians and Serbs is undisputed and ran north of Nis. The Serbian researchers (such as Dimitrije Davidovic in 1828 and Milan Savić in 1878) also accepted South Morava river as such delineation and added Niš outside the borders of the Serbian people. It was also stipulated the area to be ceded to Bulgaria according to the Constantinople Conference in 1876 and most of it according to the Treaty of San Stefano in 1878. From 1870 until then the area was part of the Bulgarian Orthodox Church, before that the area had been under the Ecumenical Patriarchate of Constantinople and the Serbian Patriarchate of Peć.

Following World War I, four territories, now known to the Bulgarian community as the Western Outlands, passed to the Kingdom of Serbs, Croats and Slovenes from Bulgaria as a war indemnity, and the remains of the old border can be seen at Vlasina lake. In the Interwar Period, the Internal Western Outland Revolutionary Organisation, countering Yugoslav rule in the region, was engaged in repeated attacks against the Yugoslav police and army. During World War II Bulgaria retook the Western Outlands, as well as Pirot and Vranje. After the Second World War, these regions were returned to Yugoslavia. After Serbia's independence, these areas remained within Serbia.

Demographics

According to the 2011 census, there were 18,543 Bulgarians in Serbia. They are primarily located in two municipalities near Serbia's border with Bulgaria: in Bosilegrad there are 5,839 Bulgarians i.e. 71.9% of population while in Dimitrovgrad (Tsaribrod) there are 5,413 Bulgarians or 53.5% of population.

The dominant religion among ethnic Bulgarians in Serbia is Orthodoxy. Islam never arrived in areas like Bosilegrad because of the mountainous terrain and most inhabitants dwelled in high mountain villages where they were hard to reach. They use both Serbian and Bulgarian churches due to the low number of Bulgarian clergymen present in the region. There is a church in every village around Bosilegrad, and the oldest ones date to the 11th century.

Notable people
 Helena of Bulgaria, regent of Serbia 1355–1356
 Gregory Tsamblak (c.1365–1420), medieval writer and cleric
Vene Bogoslavov (1932-2015),mathematician

References

See also 
 Bulgaria-Serbia relations
 Serbs in Bulgaria
 Western Outlands
 Bulgarians in North Macedonia
 Bulgarians
 Macedonian Bulgarians
 Shopi

 
Serbia
Ethnic groups in Serbia
Serbia